The 1940 Wandsworth Central by-election was held on 22 June 1940.  The by-election was held due to the resignation of the incumbent Labour MP, Harry Nathan, in order to find a seat for the trade union leader and recently appointed Minister of Labour, Ernest Bevin, who ran as a member of the Labour Party. Bevin was elected unopposed.

References

Wandsworth Central by-election
Wandsworth Central by-election
Wandsworth Central by-election
Wandsworth Central,1940
Wandsworth Central,1940
Unopposed by-elections to the Parliament of the United Kingdom in English constituencies